Good Intentions may refer to:

Films
 Good Intentions (2010 film)
 Good Intentions (1930 film)

Music
 Good Intentions (album), a 2020 album by Nav
 "Good Intentions" (EP), a 1996 song by Groove Corporation
 "Good Intentions" (Dappy song), a 2012 song by N-Dubz member Dappy from the album Bad Intentions
 "Good Intentions" (Toad the Wet Sprocket song), a single by Toad the Wet Sprocket on the album In Light Syrup 
 "Good Intentions", a 1982 song by Gerry Rafferty from the album Sleepwalking
 "Good Intentions", a 1954 song by Rosemary Clooney on the album Red Garters
 "Good Intentions", a 2015 song by Disclosure from the 2015 album Caracal

Other
 Good Intentions, the fourth book of the collected poems of Ogden Nash, published 1942

See also
 The road to hell is paved with good intentions